Harkham may refer to:

People
Efrem Harkham, Israeli-born American hotelier from Los Angeles, California.
Sammy Harkham (born 1980), American cartoonist from Los Angeles, California.
Uri Harkham, American businessman from Los Angeles, California.

Organizations
Harkham Industries, a women's fashion company headquartered in Los Angeles, California.
Harkham Properties, a commercial real estate company in Los Angeles, California.
Harkham Winery, a winery in Pokolbin, New South Wales, Australia.